Harry Boyles (November 29, 1911 – January 7, 2005) was a pitcher in Major League Baseball who appeared in eleven games for the Chicago White Sox over parts of the 1938–39 seasons.

References

External links

1911 births
2005 deaths
Major League Baseball pitchers
Chicago White Sox players
Baseball players from Illinois
People from Granite City, Illinois
Dallas Steers players
Fort Worth Cats players
Kilgore Braves players
Longview Cannibals players
St. Paul Saints (AA) players
Waterloo Hawks (baseball) players